Lakeside Woods is a census-designated place (CDP) in the town of Sherman, Fairfield County, Connecticut, United States. It is in the southern part of the town, on the western shore of Candlewood Lake. It is bordered to the north by the main village of Sherman.

Lakeside Woods was first listed as a CDP prior to the 2020 census.

References 

Census-designated places in Fairfield County, Connecticut
Census-designated places in Connecticut